The 19th Alberta Legislative Assembly was in session from May 24, 1979, to October 5, 1982, with the membership of the assembly determined by the results of the 1979 Alberta general election held on March 14, 1979. The Legislature officially resumed on May 24, 1979, and continued until the fourth session was prorogued on May 4, 1982 and dissolved on October 5, 1982, prior to the 1982 Alberta general election on November 2, 1982.

Alberta's nineteenth government was controlled by the majority Progressive Conservative Association of Alberta for the third time, led by Premier Peter Lougheed. The Official Opposition was led by Robert Curtis Clark of the Social Credit Party and later Raymond Speaker.  The Speaker was Gerard Amerongen who would serve in the role until he was defeated in the 1986 Alberta general election.

Seating plan in the 19th Assembly

Members elected
For complete electoral history, see individual districts.

Standings changes since the 19th general election

References

Further reading

External links
Alberta Legislative Assembly
Legislative Assembly of Alberta Members Book
By-elections 1905 to present

19